Del Prete is a family name of Italian origin. It may refer to: 

 Carlo Del Prete (1897-1928), a pioneer aviator from Italy
 Deborah Del Prete (b. ? ), an American producer
 Duilio Del Prete (1938-1998), an Italian actor, dubber and singer-songwriter
 Lorenzo Del Prete (born 1986), an Italian football player
 Miki Del Prete (born 1986), an Italian lyricist and record producer
 Sandro del Prete (born 1937), a Swiss artist
 Andrew Del Prete (born 1991), an American Software Engineer

See also
 Prete

Italian-language surnames